Wadgaon Road is a census town in Yavatmal district in the Indian state of Maharashtra.

Demographics
 India census, Wadgaon Road had a population of 30,786. Males constitute 52% of the population and females 48%. Wadgaon Road has an average literacy rate of 81%, higher than the national average of 59.5%: male literacy is 85%, and female literacy is 77%. In Wadgaon Road, 11% of the population is under 6 years of age.

References

Cities and towns in Yavatmal district